The Red Creek Fir is a large Douglas fir (Pseudotsuga menziesii) tree located in the San Juan Valley of Vancouver Island in British Columbia, Canada. By volume, it is the largest known Douglas fir tree on Earth.

History

The tree was seeded sometime around 1000 CE. It flourished due to its location on the shaded southern slopes of the San Juan Valley and being no more than 0.5 km (0.31 mi) from the San Juan River.

Despite various attempts by the Ancient Forest Alliance, it does not yet have formal governmental protection aside from being placed on a public recreation site. A proposal exists to extend the current Pacific Rim National Park down the west coast of the island to include the Red Creek Fir, as well as it being listed by Heritage BC. , both proposals have been unsuccessful.

Dimensions
The tree has an approximate age of at least 1000 years old.

See also 
 Port Renfrew - a nearby community
 San Juan Spruce
 Big Lonely Doug
 List of individual trees
 List of superlative trees

References

External links 
 Drone footage of the Red Creek Fir, September 2014

Individual Douglas firs
Individual trees in British Columbia
Juan de Fuca region